Thomas Bucknell Hanson (2 July 1891 – 27 December 1986) was a former Australian rules footballer who played with Carlton in the Victorian Football League (VFL).

Notes

External links 

Tom Hanson's profile at Blueseum

1891 births
Australian rules footballers from Victoria (Australia)
Carlton Football Club players
1986 deaths